The Green Party of Canada ran a full slate of 308 candidates in the 2006 Canadian federal election. Some of these candidates have separate biography pages; relevant information about other candidates may be found here.

The candidates are listed by province and riding name.

Prince Edward Island

Sharon Labchuk (Malpeque)
She previously ran for the Green Party in the 2004 federal election, also in Malpeque, but lost to Wayne Easter of the Liberal Party of Canada. Labchuk received 1,037 votes to Easter's 9,782.

Nova Scotia

Chris Milburn (Sydney—Victoria)

Milburn is a physician.  He was born in Sydney, Cape Breton Island, Nova Scotia, and trained in emergency and family medicine at Queen's University in Kingston, Ontario.  He held several medical positions in and around the Kingston area after graduating, including a stint as a clinic doctor in Lansdowne after the small community lost its previous doctor (KWS, 22 November 2000).  Milburn is also a skilled athlete, and has participated in several triathlons.  He was a member of the Kingston Whig-Standards community editorial board in the late 1990s, and frequently contributed to its columns (KWS, 11 October 2000).

Milburn joined the Green Party shortly before the 2000 federal election, and campaigned in the Ontario riding of Kingston and the Islands.  He emphasized health issues, and wrote against the privatisation of prescription medicine (KWS, 1 November 2000).  He received 2,652 votes (5.18%), the best showing for a Green candidate outside of British Columbia.  Milburn defeated Fred Perel to win the Green Party of Ontario nomination for Kingston and the Islands in the 2003 provincial election (KWS, 9 October 2002),  but left for a job in New Brunswick shortly before the campaign (KWS, 8 September 2003).

At the time of the 2004 election, Milburn was a physician with the emergency unit at Cape Breton Regional Hospital (Medical Post, 15 June 2004).  He had recently purchased the historic site of the old City Hospital, where he planned to build a "green" neighbourhood.  He was 34 years old.  He received 855 votes, finishing fourth.

As of 2005, Milburn is the GPC's Healthcare Advocate.

Nick Wright (Halifax)
Nick Wright ran in the Halifax riding and received 1948 votes, 3.9% of the popular vote in a riding dominated by long-time NDP candidate Alexa McDonough.

Quebec

Adam Sommerfeld (Longueuil—Pierre-Boucher)

Sommerfeld is both a young politician and a veteran environmental activist.  While in high school, he started the LEAF (Lisgar Environmental Action Force) organization and affiliated it with the Sierra Youth Coalition.  He was also active with the OPIRG-affiliated group Enviro-Action while attending the University of Ottawa.  He holds a Bachelor of Fine Arts degree from Concordia University in Montreal.

He joined the Green Party of Canada in 2000 at age eighteen, and campaigned under its banner in the 2000 federal election.  The 2006 campaign was his third for the party.

Ontario

Beaches—East York: Jim Harris
Jim Harris was the leader of the Green Party of Canada.

Brampton—Springdale: Ian Raymond Chiocchio

Chiocchio holds a Bachelor of Business Administration degree from Brock University, and completed a two-year management training program with a Fortune 500 company.  He was assistant manager of the Brock University pub, and as of 2006 is the co-owner of a landscaping business.  He received 1,853 votes (3.93%), finishing fourth against Liberal incumbent Ruby Dhalla.

Brant: Adam KingAdam King was born in London, Ontario. He spent most of his childhood and teenage years in Bangladesh, where his family worked for a Baptist non-governmental organization, and he became interested in social issues at an early age. King's family returned to Canada in 1999, and he later took a Bachelor of Arts degree in Political Science from York University (2007). He was twenty-three years old during the 2006 campaign.

King has also run for the Brantford city council. He served on the City of Brantford's heritage committee, planning department, and cultural network from 2006 to 2008, and in 2007 he started an ethical coffee chain.

Bruce—Grey—Owen Sound: Shane Jolley

Shane Jolley ran the most successful Green Party campaign in the 2006 election.

Carleton—Mississippi Mills: Jake Cole

Jake Cole has lived in Kanata with his wife and two children for over 28 years. He is an active member of the local community, volunteering with the Scouts Canada Kanata branch, the Canadian Mental Health Association, the Earl of March Secondary School Parent's Council, and coaching community baseball, soccer and hockey.

Educated as a civil engineer in Ottawa, Jake has spent more than thirty years working as a public servant for the federal government. In that time, he has led the Canadian contingent on the International Energy Agency's projects in solar, wind, and renewable energy. He also led Canada's R-2000 Home Energy Program, created and led a unique health and well-being program for 11,000 federal employees and currently manages the Canadian Coast Guard's environmental program.

As a long-standing community member, Jake has been very active in a variety of campaigns and grass roots political movements. In 1990, Jake Cole helped form the first Green Party of Canada chapter in Kanata. Jake has been an active campaigner against cosmetic pesticides use on lawns and playing fields. Jake is the communication advisor for the Canadian Organic Growers. Jake made submissions to the Kirby and Romanow Health Commissions. Jake actively campaigns for health promotion programs.

Eglinton—Lawrence: Patrick Metzger

Metzger holds an Honours Bachelor of Arts degree in French and English literature from the University of Western Ontario, and a Master of Business Administration from the Richard Ivey School of Business.  He worked fifteen years in the banking and brokerage industry, including experience with Merrill Lynch in Hong Kong. After returning to Canada in 2001, he changed careers and became a writer and television producer.  He received 2,520 votes (5.12%), finishing fourth against Liberal incumbent Joe Volpe.

Etobicoke–Lakeshore: Philip Ridge

Philip Ridge ran against Michael Ignatieff who later became the leader of the Liberal Party.

Philip comes from a diverse background of engineering and marketing and currently owns Ridge Energy Consultants Inc www.ridge.ca and The Energy Store www.theenergystore.ca

Philip successfully increased Green Party votes by a high percentage. His main thrust was educating the voters on the amount of toxins produced in the riding - the highest in Toronto.

Haliburton—Kawartha Lakes—Brock: Andy HarjulaAndy Harjula was born in Finland and moved to Ontario as a child. He has a diploma in forestry from Lakehead University in Thunder Bay and a Master's Degree in forestry from Colorado State University. He moved to Cavan, Ontario, in 1988.

Harjula worked for the Ontario Ministry of Natural Resources for twenty-seven years, accepting retirement when Mike Harris's government made cutbacks to the department. He has co-ordinated the establishment and operations of provincial parks and done landscape work. In 2006, he was a director of the Victoria Lands and Water Stewardship Council and the Otonbee Conservation Foundation. He was sixty-three years old when he was nominated as a Green Party candidate in 2005.

He was a member of the Conservative Party of Canada and its antecedents before joining the Greens. Himself a gun owner, he supported the Canadian Firearms Registry in the 2006 election, saying "If (they) are stolen [...] I'd like (them) returned."

After the 2006 federal election, Harjula said that he would not seek federal office again. He ran for a council seat in Cavan in 2006 and 2010, finishing a close second both times.

Hamilton Centre: John Livingstone

Livingstone was born in Hamilton.  He is a 22-year veteran of the Canadian Army and has served overseas in Germany and the Golan Heights, where he saw two tours of duty with the United Nations Disengagement Observer force.  He was fifty-two years old at the time of the election, and was operations director for a local branch of the Canadian Corps of Commissionaires.  Before joining the Green Party, he volunteered for the Liberals (Hamilton Spectator, 13 January 2006).  He received 2,022 votes (4.23%), finishing fourth against New Democratic Party incumbent David Christopherson.

Kingston and the Islands: Eric Walton

Walton was born in Ottawa, and grew up in the Middle East, Asia and Europe (Kingston Whig-Standard, 21 January 2006).  He received an Honours Bachelor of Arts degree in Political Studies from Queen's University in 1983.  He is a co-founder of Odyssey Travel and Logkit Inc., both of which he later sold.  In 1992, he co-produced and directed "Ancient Futures-Learning From Ladakh", filmed on site in northern India.

Walton was the part-time Agency Director of the Kingston Environmental Action Project from 1986 to 1994 (KWS, 7 January 2006), and was active in community affairs.    He helped to re-launch the Kingston branch of the Green Party in 1992 (KWS, 23 November 1992), and was drafted to campaign for the Green Party of Ontario in 2003 when designated candidate Chris Milburn moved to Nova Scotia.

Walton won the 2006 GPC nomination in late 2004, over George Clark and Queen's Law student Danny Gold (KWS, 10 November 2004).  He was endorsed by the Kingston Whig-Standard newspaper during the campaign (21 January 2006).  As of 2007, he is the business manager of a medical clinic and the Green Party of Canada Shadow Cabinet Advocate/Critic for Industry and Entrepreneurship.

Kitchener Centre: Tony MaasTony Maas was the federal Green Party candidate for the Kitchener Centre electoral district in Ontario in the 2006 elections. He received 5.6% of the vote in 2822 of 50194 votes cast.

Lanark—Frontenac—Lennox and Addington: Mike Nickerson

Nickerson (born 1951) is a longtime environmental activist.  He was a co-director of the Institute for the Study of Cultural Evolution in the 1970s, and helped produce its Guideposts for a Sustainable Future in 1974.  In 1977, the background studies which led to the Guideposts were published as Change the World I Want to Stay On.

He was a founding member of the Green Party of Canada in 1983, and campaigned under its banner in the 1984 federal election.  His mother, Betty Nickerson, was the first ever GPC candidate in a 1983 by-election (Ottawa Citizen, 2 January 2006).  In 1988, he spoke out against the proposed Canada-United States free trade agreement (Toronto Star, 19 November 1988).

He completed production of the Guideposts for a Sustainable Future video in 1990, and published his second book, Planning for Seven Generations , in 1993.  He is near completion of a third book entitled Life, Money and Illusion, and has composed several articles on environmentalism and economics.  In 2001, Nickerson collaborated with Liberal Member of Parliament Joe Jordan to create the Canada Well-being Measurement Act (Kingston Whig-Standard, 21 February 2001).

In 2002, he wrote an article criticizing the provincial government of Ernie Eves for imposing a freeze on hydro rates.  Nickerson supported the energy policies of the previous government of Mike Harris, which he argued encouraged conservation by forcing consumers to pay higher rates.

Nickerson is a woodworker in private life.

Leeds—Grenville: David Lee

David Lee was born on February 18, 1968.  David was raised in Barrie and Peterborough, Ontario, where he served as an infantry scout, and later, still seventeen, as a squad leader in the Hastings & Prince Edward Mechanized Infantry Regiment.  He then put himself through school as a door-to-door salesman earning a B.A. in literature, history, and critical theory from Trent University. After graduation he travelled and then became a tradesman. At the age of twenty-six David spent a year with two friends deep in the woods of the Smoky Mountains of northern Georgia building a log cabin from scratch, living off the land without electricity, and farming its adjacent field.

Upon his return David earned a diploma in script writing from Algonquin College. His first screenplay (the autobiographical story of two young men who embark on an adventure-filled road trip in search of J.D. Salinger) was optioned by CTV.  In 1999 David was a government conference reporter, a screenwriter, and a semi-pro lacrosse player.  In a pre-season (and pre-contract/insurance) game, David's lower back was permanently damaged. After his surgery he returned to school to earn an M.A. in political science.

David has lived all over North America before settling in Nepean-Carleton on a farm south of Ottawa in the mid-1990s. Since 2001, David has done contract work for several government ministries. Most recently he has worked as a communications officer covering Russia, and the Iraq war for the Department of Foreign Affairs. When David was recovering from his surgeries he taught himself how to sing, play harmonica, and sketch.  He has replaced athletics and camping with political philosophy and analysis, song-writing, and other indoor intellectual and artistic pursuits.  He also volunteers for moderate environmental groups, disability advocates, and his church, where he sings in the choir.  He is currently writing his first novel.

In 2005 David rebuilt the Leeds-Grenville Federal Green Party Association, and won the nomination for the 2006 election.  A rookie and parachute candidate, he still managed a top 40 result, increasing his party's 2004 vote by over forty percent.

Nepean—Carleton: Lori Gadzala
She is a businesswoman from Manotick, Ontario having lived there for 10 years, and previously lived in Gloucester, Ontario.

A graduate of Algonquin College, Lori runs her own private company South River Partners, a technology marketing writing and communications firm. She has previously worked for Cisco Systems, Nokia, Alcatel, and Gandalf Technologies.

Lori and her husband have received honourable mentions from the Rideau Valley Conservation Authority, and Lori is a brownie leader in her hometown, in addition to other community activities.
Campaign website
Riding profile
Lori's blog

Newmarket—Aurora: Glenn HubbersGlenn Hubbers is a professional engineer and project manager who has been working in the energy industry since 1989 after graduating from McMaster University with a Bachelor of Engineering. Glenn was instrumental in founding the Newmarket—Aurora Federal Green Party Association   in 2005. The 39th Canadian General Election was Glenn's first time running for federal office. Glenn earned 4.74% of the popular vote, placing 4th to Liberal incumbent Belinda Stronach.  Glenn won the nomination contest in 2007 and earned 8.2% of the popular vote in the 40th Canadian General Election
Glenn maintains a personal blog which can be found at http://www.hubbers.ca.
Newmarket—Aurora Federal Green Party Association
Glenn's Blog

Federal election results

|-

|-
 
|align="left" colspan=2|Liberal gain from Conservative 
|align="right"|Swing|align="right"| −4.8
|align="right"|

Ottawa West—Nepean: Neil Adair

Adair is a businessman, chemist and web designer.  Raised in Ottawa, he attended Carleton University and worked for eight years at the Canadian Conservation Institute as an analytical chemist.  He then worked for Vickers Instruments for four years, including three years in Santa Clara, California.  Desiring a change in life, he moved to the Dominican Republic to begin a windsurfing business.  He remained in that country for ten years, starting three businesses and one charity.  His windsurfing business was operated by solar panels and a wind generator.

Adair returned to Ottawa in 2001, and expressed an interest in working with solar and wind power.  Since then, he has undertaken extensive web design work for the Green Party.  Adair has campaigned for the federal party twice, and has also been a candidate of the Green Party of Ontario.

Peterborough: Brent WoodBrent Wood born in Burlington, Ontario. He has a Bachelor of Arts degree from the University of Guelph, a Master of Arts degree from Trent University, and a Ph.D. from the University of Toronto. He has taught English at Toronto and Trent, with a focus on Canadian writers, and has also served on the executive of the Canadian Union of Public Employees Local 3908 at Trent. In 2004, he was a member of Peterborough's parks and recreation board. He ran for the Peterborough city council in 2003, opposing the extension of a local parkway. He has been a Green Party candidate in two federal elections.

Richmond Hill: Tim Rudkins
Tim Rudkins won 2379 votes (4.57%)

St. Catharines: Jim Fannon
See article on Jim Fannon.

Simcoe—Grey: Peter Ellis
Ellis is a businessman and teacher.  He holds a Master of Science degree from McGill University in Montreal, began his career as a Biology teacher, and was a school principal for two years at Baffin Island in the Northwest Territories.  Ellis has been president of Peachtree Manufacturing Ltd. in 1986, and has served on the CNIB Simcoe/Muskoka District Board and the Halton Regional Conservation Authority. 

He first campaigned for the Green Party in Simcoe—Grey in the 2004 election.

Scarborough Southwest: Valery Philip

Philip is a graduate of the Marketing and Business Program at Seneca College, and worked for a number of years in the corporate world.  She is now an aromatherapist, treating patients with AIDS and other serious diseases.

She received 1,827 votes (4.38%), finishing fourth against Liberal incumbent Tom Wappel.

Scarborough—Guildwood: Mike Flanagan

Flanagan is a graduate of the University of Waterloo, with a degree in Psychology, and minors both in History and Criminology/Legal Studies. He received 1,235 votes (3%), finishing fourth against Liberal incumbent John McKay (politician). He currently serves as a director for the Toronto Vegetarian Association.

Sudbury: Joey MethéJoey Methé was eighteen years old at the time of the election, and was in his first year of public relations studies at Cambrian College.  He is bilingual in English and French, and has promoted youth events focused on Franco-Ontarian culture.  During the election, he described Pierre Trudeau as his favourite Canadian politician.  He received 1,301 votes (2.73%), finishing fourth against Liberal incumbent Diane Marleau.

Thornhill: Lloyd Helferty

Lloyd Helferty was born in 1972 in Windsor and grew up in Richmond Hill, where he lived until moving to Thornhill in December 2003. Lloyd graduated from the RCC School of Electronics Technology as an Honours Electronics Technologist in 1995. Lloyd Helferty sits on the Executive of the Green Party of Ontario as Central Representative. He also sits on the Executive of the Richmond Hill Naturalists club. In 2004, Helferty received 1,622 votes (3.0%). His main opponent was Liberal incumbent Susan Kadis.

Toronto Centre: Chris TindalChris Tindal (born June 3, 1981) was a candidate for Ward 27 in the 2010 Toronto municipal election. He was the Green Party of Canada's candidate for the House of Commons of Canada in Toronto Centre in the 2006 federal election and again in a March 17, 2008 by-election in which he placed 3rd with 13.6% of the vote, ahead of the Conservative candidate.

He holds a Bachelor of Arts in Radio and Television from Ryerson University. He is also a musician with two albums to his credit.

Tindal is an interactive media producer and former vice president of the Ontario Recreational Canoeing Association, and has lived in Toronto Centre since 2000. He serves on the board of directors of a boys and girls residential summer camp, and is a contributor to Torontoist, a community blog. Tindal was the Democratic Reform Advocate for the Green Party of Canada until August 2008.

Tindal is a coauthor of A Realistic Energy Plan for Toronto.

Electoral record

|Liz White
|align=right|72
|align=right|0.12%
|align=right

|- bgcolor="white"

|align="left" colspan=2|Liberal hold 
|align="right"|Swing|align="right"| −2.1
|align="right"|

Wellington—Halton Hills: Brent Bouteiller

Bouteiller received a Bachelor of Engineering degree from Carleton University in 1990, and has been involved in a variety of focus groups concerned with transportation issues.  He is an entrepreneur, and has operated a model train shop near Fergus, Ontario since 1998.

He joined the Green Party in 1999, and has campaigned for both its federal and provincial wings.  In 2003, he campaigned for municipal office.  Bouteiller is 37 years old , and lives outside of Fergus.  He was the GPC's candidate for the 2006 federal election.

(The 2003 municipal result is taken from the Kitchener-Waterloo Record, 12 November 2003, B8.  The final official results were not significantly different.)

Whitby—Oshawa: Ajay Krishnan

Krishnan was born in India and raised in Kuwait, and moved to Canada with his family at the start of the 1991 Gulf War.  He holds a degree in Engineering Science from the University of Toronto, and is a co-founder and Vice-President of Engineering for Savvica Inc., an e-learning software company.  He was twenty-three years old during the election, and describes his political background as "centre-right".  He received 2,407 votes (3.60%), finishing fourth against Conservative candidate Jim Flaherty.

Windsor Tecumseh: Catherine Pluard

Catherine was born in Sarnia Ontario, in 1972, and graduated from Lambton College with a diploma in Early Childhood Education in 2000. She moved to Windsor four-years ago to attend university, and at the time of the election was completing a joint BSW degree program in Social Work and Women's Studies. Catherine also served as a substitute educator at a community day nursery, and was a single mother of an eight-year-old daughter.

Catherine is a community activist who is often involved in women's and environmental issues. In previous years Catherine had contributed to the organizing of the December 6 memorial vigil, assisted with organizing "Take Back the Night" marches and other consciousness-raising activities. She was a student representative on both the Women's Studies Curriculum Committee and the Women's Studies Advisory Committee. She was also the representative for joint majors in her degree program in both the Social Work Students Association (SWSA) and the Women's Studies Student Association (WSSA).

Windsor West: Jillana Bishop

Bishop was born in Windsor, and graduated with Honours from Massey Secondary School (Windsor Star, 19 December 2005).  She was twenty-four years old during the election, and worked as a machine operator at Haas Precision Corporation (Windsor Star, 10 January 2006).  She declined to use campaign signs, arguing that they consume resources and pollute the landscape (Star, 9 December 2005).  She received 1,444 votes (3.03%), finishing fourth against New Democratic Party incumbent Brian Masse.

Manitoba

Mike Johannson (Charleswood—St. James—Assiniboia)
Johannson (born in St. James, Manitoba) is the son of Joan Johannson, an anti-poverty activist and former Green Party of Manitoba candidate, and Robert Johannson, a former Winnipeg city councillor.  He worked at New World Technology for five years, and has been a supervisor at Southern Produce since the early 2000s (decade).

According to a Winnipeg Free Press article, he chose to campaign in the 2006 election out of concern for the health of Lake Winnipeg and the Red River.  He received 1,700 votes (3.84%), finishing fourth against Conservative incumbent Steven Fletcher.

Jeff Fountain (Churchill)
Fountain holds a Bachelor of Science degree in Biology and Environmental Science from the University of Winnipeg.  He has worked as an operator trainee with Inco, and previously taught English as a Second Language in Japan (Winnipeg Free Press, 3 January 2006).  Fountain has reached nidan rank in Judo and Kendo, is a brown belt in Jujutsu, and teaches wrestling in Thompson.

He received 401 votes (1.61%), finishing fifth against Liberal candidate Tina Keeper.

Tanja Hutter (Elmwood—Transcona)Tanja Hutter''' has a Bachelor of Arts degree in International Relations, Political Science and German from the University of Manitoba, and works as a researcher, writer, editor and web designer.Elmwood-Transcona riding profile, Canada Votes 2006, Canadian Broadcasting Corporation, accessed 1 March 2007.  She has been web editor for Canada's National History Society and The Beaver, and was an associate editor for the Encyclopedia of Natural Health.  She received 1,211 votes (3.63%), finishing fourth against New Democratic Party incumbent Bill Blaikie.

Charlie Howatt (Portage—Lisgar)

Howatt holds an Agriculture degree from the University of Manitoba.  He was twenty-five years old as of the 2006 election, working in a family farm business with his father and grandfather.  The family enterprise grows grain and forages, and raises hogs.  Howatt has argued that farmers can reverse a recent trend toward rural decline by adopting environmentally sound policies.  He is active with the Pembina Soil and Crop Management Association, and often performs as a guitarist.

Howatt defended the Canadian Wheat Board in the 2006 campaign, and criticized the packing industry for profiteering during western Canada's BSE crisis.  He received 1,880 votes (5.10%) in 2006, finishing fourth against Conservative incumbent Brian Pallister.

Janine Gibson (Provencher)
Gibson was educated at the University of Manitoba and the University of Winnipeg, and has worked as an independent organic inspector since 1993.  She is president of Canadian Organic Growers, and has worked toward the adoption of a national organic standard for Canada (Winnipeg Free Press, 4 February & 8 June 2004, Globe and Mail, 21 April 2005).  Gibson teaches other inspectors through the Independent Organic Inspectors Association.

She lives in a solar and wind-powered village known as Northern Sun Farm Cooperative in southeastern Manitoba, and attracted national attention during the 2005-06 campaign when she was forced to live without electricity for twenty-two days in a period of cloudy skies and mild winds.  Gibson cited global warming as being responsible for the weather patterns, though she also claims the lack of electricity did not seriously affect her campaign schedule global warming  (Broadcast News, 17 January 2006).

She supported Tom Manley for the leadership of the Green Party in 2004.

Marc Payette (St. Boniface)

Payette has a Bachelor of Arts degree from the University of Manitoba, and is a graduate of Red River College's Communication Engineering Technology Program.  He was employed for many years with Via Rail, and has been a Meteorological Technician for Environment Canada in Saskatchewan, Ontario and the Northwest Territories.  Since 1997, he has worked as a programmer analyst at St. Boniface College in Winnipeg.  Payette became president of the Manitoba Government and General Employees Union Local 147 in January 2003, and has volunteered for Festival du Voyageur, the Winnipeg Folk Festival and Big Brothers Big Sisters of Winnipeg.  The 2006 election was his second as a candidate.

In 2002, Payette wrote a Letter to the Editor in the Winnipeg Free Press endorsing wind power and solar power as energy sources (WFP, 4 July 2002).

David Michael Carey (Winnipeg North)

Carey has served in the Canadian military, and holds diploma certification as a welder/fitter and an aircraft maintenance engineer.  He moved to Manitoba from Ontario in the early 2000s (decade), and worked for Air Canada at the time of the election (Winnipeg Free Press, 2 January 2006).  He was planning to build an "eco-friendly rammed-earth tire home" in 2006.  He received 779 votes (2.86%), finishing fourth against New Democratic Party incumbent Judy Wasylycia-Leis.  He campaigned for the leadership of the Green Party of Manitoba in November 2006, and lost to Andrew Basham.

Wesley Owen Whiteside (Winnipeg South)
Whiteside was twenty-six years old at the time of the election (Winnipeg Sun, 15 January 2006 ), and according to a Green Party biography has lived in Winnipeg for his entire life.  He holds a Bachelor of Arts degree in Politics and Administrative Studies from the University of Winnipeg, and is working toward the completion of a Bachelor of Laws degree from the University of Manitoba as of early 2006.  He plans to article with the Manitoba government after his graduation.  Whiteside also volunteers with the Royal Canadian Air Cadet Program as an Officer in the Reserves.

He received 1,289 votes (3.08%), finishing fourth against Conservative Rod Bruinooge.

Vere H. Scott (Winnipeg South Centre)

Scott has studied agriculture at the University of Manitoba, and is a retired wildlife biologist. During the 1980s, he served on the provincial Minister of the Environment's advisory committee concerning mosquito control and other matters.  He is a veteran environmental activist in Winnipeg, and encouraged composting in the early 1990s.  Scott was a founding member of the Green Party of Manitoba, and has served as the party's policy expert.  He co-authored the Manitoba Clean Environment Commission's hearings into the City of Winnipeg's polluting sewage collection and treatment system in 2003, and in the 2006 campaign called for cities to stop dumping their sewage (treated or not) into river systems.
 

Saskatchewan

Rick Barsky (Saskatoon—Rosetown—Biggar)

Barsky ran in the federal election of 1993 in Canada for election to the House of Commons of Canada as a candidate for Mel Hurtig's National Party of Canada. He ran again in the federal election of 1997 for the Canadian Action Party, and was a candidate for the Legislative Assembly of Saskatchewan in 1999 for the New Green Alliance.

More recently, Rick was the candidate in Saskatoon-Rosetown-Biggar for the Green Party of Canada in the federal elections of 2004 and 2006.

External links
Rick Barsky's biography

Don Cameron (Saskatoon—Wanuskewin)

Cameron was born in northeastern Saskatchewan, and attended the University of Saskatchewan.  He moved to Ottawa to accept a job in the federal civil service, and later opened a consulting firm.  His campaign emphasized a tax on junk food to combat the rising health care expenditures (Saskatoon Star-Phoenix, 9 January 2006).  He received 1,292 votes (3.59%), finishing fourth against Conservative incumbent Maurice Vellacott.

Alberta

Juliet Burgess (Calgary—Nose Hill)
At 18 years of age, Juliet was the youngest candidate running in this election. Burgess is a born and raised Calgarian, an activist and arts worker. She worked with the Rock The Vote youth action committee, spoke for the decriminalization of marijuana and sex work, advocated for more public transit investments in Calgary. Burgess ran the following year in the Alberta Provincial election for the Alberta Greens and has continued to be a social advocate, presently working as a Social Worker with survivors of domestic violence and LGBTQ2S+ populations.

Kim Warnke (Calgary Southwest)

Warnke is a lifelong resident of Calgary, and was listed as twenty-four years old at the time of the election.  She had six years experience on the Calgary Health Authority, and spent a year on the Emergency Department Advisory board as a representative of Nursing Attendants.  Warnke has criticized Canada's First Past The Post electoral system, and rejects the accusation that the Green Party was responsible for vote-splitting on the left in the 2004 federal election.

Warnke argued for expanded mass transit services in the 2004 provincial election.  In the 2006 campaign, she argued that Alberta needs to use its oil revenues wisely to benefit future generations, and was quoted as saying, "We don't want Alberta to be without oil like Atlantic Canada without cod" (Calgary Herald'', 21 December 2005).

On September 30, 2006, Warnke was elected as Deputy Leader South for the Alberta Greens.

Lynn Lau (Edmonton—Sherwood Park)
Lynn Lau campaign webpage

British Columbia

Karan Bowyer (Okanagan—Coquihalla)
Bowyer is a mother of three who was born and raised in the Kootenays. She graduated from the University of British Columbia and now works for an e-learning company.
GPC Riding Profile

Phil Brienesse(Skeena—Bulkley Valley)
Brienesse is a 32 year old retail manager. He has served on the Town of Smithers, British Columbia Planning and Design Committee since 2002 and was a Director of the Smithers Chamber of Commerce between 2004 and 2005.
GPC Riding Profile

Alex Bracewell (Cariboo—Prince George)
Bracewell is a politician and eco-tourism businessman in West Chilcotin, near Williams Lake, British Columbia. He was elected Director of Electoral Area "J" in the Cariboo Regional District in 2002, and acclaimed in 2005. He was born in Williams Lake but raised in nearby Tatlayoko Lake Valley.
GPC Riding Profile

Hilary Crowley (Prince George—Peace River)
Crowley is a retired physiotherapist from Prince George, British Columbia. She ran unsuccessfully in the 2000 and 2004 federal elections in this riding.
GPC Riding Profile

Matt Greenwood (Kamloops—Thompson—Cariboo)
Greenwood is a 25-year-old university student, born in Vancouver and raised in Kamloops. He is working towards a bachelor's degree with a double major in political science and economics, and a minor in philosophy, at Thompson Rivers University. He helped found the Kamloops chapter of the BC Sustainable Energy Association.
GPC Riding Profile

Scott Janzen (Burnaby—New Westminster)
Janzen is a Green Party politician in Burnaby, British Columbia, Canada. He graduated from the University of Saskatchewan with degrees in Electrical Engineering and Computer Science.
Campaign website
GPC Riding Profile

Ariel Lade (Victoria)
Ariel Lade (b. 1975 in White Rock) is a Green politician and economist in Victoria, British Columbia, Canada. He has earned a master's degree in economics and philosophy at the London School of Economics and toured Eastern Europe.

Lade majored in economics and political science at University of Victoria. He earned a master's degree in economics and philosophy at the London School of Economics.
GPC Riding Profile

Scott Leyland (British Columbia Southern Interior)
Leyland is a 55-year-old physiotherapist from Trail, British Columbia. He also works as a clinical instructor at the University of British Columbia's School of Rehabilitation Sciences.
GPC Riding Profile

Harry Naegel (Okanagan—Shuswap)
Naegel is a horticultural consultant/contractor. He ran unsuccessfully in the 1997, 2000 and 2004 federal elections in the Okanagan—Coquihalla riding. Has run in every federal, provincial and municipal election since 1993.
GPC Riding Profile

Clements Verhoeven (Kootenay—Columbia)
Verhoeven is a 52-year-old born and raised in London, Ontario. He is a high school teacher in Creston, British Columbia. He is bilingual and a published novelist.
GPC Riding Profile

Footnotes

 
Green Party of Canada candidates in Canadian Federal elections
candidates in the 2006 Canadian federal election